S. J. Moreland and Sons was a family company, founded in 1867 and wound up in 1976. It manufactured "England's Glory" matches.

History
Samuel J. Moreland, son of a sawyer from Stroud, Gloucestershire was born in 1828. In 1867, he moved to Gloucester, and opened the Moreland Trade Factory (which still stands today, on Bristol Road) to manufacture those matches.

In 2010, there was a campaign to relight the celebrated "England's Glory" sign (unlit since the 1970s) on the factory, some residents even offering to pay.

The electoral ward of Moreland, Gloucester is named after the factory.

References

External links
 https://www.gracesguide.co.uk/S._J._Moreland_and_Sons

Companies based in Gloucester
Defunct manufacturing companies of the United Kingdom
1867 establishments in England
1976 disestablishments in England
British companies established in 1867
Manufacturing companies established in 1867
Bristol Road
British companies disestablished in 1976
Industrial history of Gloucestershire